In politics, a partition is a change of political borders cutting through at least one territory considered a homeland by some community.

Arguments for 
historicist – that partition is inevitable, or already in progress
 last resort – that partition should be pursued to avoid the worst outcomes (genocide or large-scale ethnic expulsion), if all other means fail
 cost–benefit – that partition offers a better prospect of conflict reduction than the if existing borders are not changed
 better tomorrow – that partition will reduce current violence and conflict, and that the new more homogenized states will be more stable
 rigorous end – heterogeneity leads to problems, hence homogeneous states should be the goal of any policy

Arguments against 

 national territorial unity will be lost
 bi-nationalism and multi-nationalism are not undesirable
 the impossibility of a just partition
 difficult in deciding how the new border(s) will be drawn
 the likelihood of disorder and violence
 partitioning alone does not lead to the desired homogenization
 security issues arising within the borders of the new states
Daniel Posner has argued that partitions of diverse communities into homogenous communities is unlikely to solve problems of communal conflict, as the boundary changes will alter the actors' incentives and give rise to new cleavages. For example, while the Muslim and Hindu cleavages might have been the most salient amid the Indian independence movement, the creation of a religiously homogenous Hindu state (India) and a religiously homogeneous Muslim state (Pakistan) created new social cleavages on lines other than religion in both of those states. Posner writes that relatively homogenous countries  can be more violence-prone than countries with a large number of evenly matched ethnic groups.

Examples
Notable examples are: (See Category:Partition)
 Partition of Africa (Scramble for Africa), between 1881 and 1914 under the General Act of the Berlin Conference.
 Partition, multiple times, of the Roman Empire into the Eastern Roman Empire and the Western Roman Empire, following the Crisis of the Third Century.
 Partition of Prussia by the Second Peace of Thorn in 1466. creating Royal Prussia, and Duchy of Prussia in 1525
 Partition of Catalonia by the Treaty of the Pyrenees in 1659: Northern Catalan territories (Roussillon) were given to France by Spain.
 In the Treaty of Versailles (1757), France agreed upon the partition of Prussia
 Partition of the U.S. state of Virginia in 1863 after Virginia joined the Confederacy in the American Civil War, 50 northwestern counties rejoined the Union as the State of West Virginia.
 German occupation of Czechoslovakia: The Sudetenland was ceded to Nazi Germany under the Munich Agreement of 1938, and the country was later divided into the German-administered Protectorate of Bohemia and Moravia and the nominally independent Slovak Republic; later reunified at the end of World War II.
 Three Partitions of Luxembourg, the last of which in 1839, divided Luxembourg between France, Prussia, Belgium, and the independent Grand Duchy of Luxembourg.
 Three Partitions of Poland in 1772, 1793, and 1795, which led to the complete annihilation of the Polish–Lithuanian Commonwealth.
 1905 Partition of Bengal and 1947 Partition of Bengal.
 The Treaty of Bucharest in 1913 partitioned the region of Macedonia between Serbia (now North Macedonia), Greece and Bulgaria.
 Partition of Tyrol by the London Pact of 1915 ratified during World War I. 
 Partition of the German Empire in 1919 by the Treaty of Versailles. 
Partition of Prussia in 1919.
 Partition of the Ottoman Empire.
 Partition of the Austrian-Hungarian Empire by the Treaty of Saint-Germain-en-Laye and the Treaty of Trianon. 
 Partition of Ireland in 1920 into the independent Irish Free State and Northern Ireland.
 Treaty of Kars of 1921, which partitioned Ottoman Armenia between Turkey and the Soviet Union (Western and Eastern Armenia).
 Partition of Allied-occupied Germany and Berlin after World War II
 The Morgenthau Plan proposed independent states in North and South Germany, an international zone in the Ruhr Area, and the transfer of disputed border areas to France and Poland 
 The actual post-war settlement created West Germany and East Germany and included the annexation of former eastern territories of Germany by Poland and Soviet Union. Later, East and West Germany were unified at the end of the Cold War. 
 Partition of East Prussia between Poland and the Soviet Union
 Partition of Korea in 1945 into American and Soviet zones of occupation.
 Division of Korea in 1953 between North Korea and South Korea after the Korean War. 
 1947 UN Partition Plan for British Mandate of Palestine; this partition was abortive, resulting only in a Jewish independent state (Israel), while the territories of the proposed Arab state were occupied by Israel, Transjordan and Egypt.
 Partition of India (colonial British India) in 1947 into the independent dominions (later republics) of India and Pakistan (which included modern-day Bangladesh).
 Partition of China (See 瓜分中國) during the Chinese Civil War in 1946–1950 resulted the original territory of the Republic of China into the People's Republic of China in Mainland China and the Republic of China on Taiwan and other island groups.
 Partition of Punjab in 1966 into the states of Punjab, Haryana and Himachal Pradesh.
 Partition of Vietnam in 1954 between North Vietnam and South Vietnam under the Geneva Accord after the First Indochina War. Later reunified in 1976 after the Vietnam War. 
 The hypothetical partition of the Canadian province of Quebec.
 Breakup of Yugoslavia in the 1990s.
 Independence of Croatia, Bosnia and Herzegovina, North Macedonia and Slovenia from Yugoslavia (leaving Serbia and Montenegro).
 Failed partition of the Republic of Serbian Krajina in Croatia after the Croatian War
 Ethno-political partition of Bosnia and Herzegovina into two entities, the Serb-majority Republika Srpska and the Bosniak-Croat-majority Federation of Bosnia and Herzegovina, after the Bosnian War.
 Partition of Czechoslovakia in 1993 into the independent entities of the Czech Republic and Slovakia.
 Partition of Cyprus in 1974 (de facto), into Greek-majority Cyprus and Turkish-majority Northern Cyprus after the Turkish invasion of Cyprus. 
 Possible Partition of Kosovo after disputed independence (partition from Serbia) in 2008. See also Kosovo independence precedent.
 Partition of Sudan into two entities in 2011, the Muslim-majority Sudan and the Christian-majority South Sudan.

See also
 Separatism
 Secession

References

Further reading
Sambanis, Nicholas, and Jonah Schulhofer-Wohl. "What's in a line? Is partition a solution to civil war?." International Security 34.2 (2009): 82–118.
Berg, Eiki. "Re-examining sovereignty claims in changing territorialities: reflections from ‘Kosovo Syndrome’." Geopolitics 14.2 (2009): 219-234.
Fearon, James D. "Separatist wars, partition, and world order." Security Studies 13.4 (2004): 394–415.
Downes, Alexander B. "More Borders, Less Conflict? Partition as a Solution to Ethnic Civil Wars." SAIS Review of International Affairs 26.1 (2006): 49–61.
Kumar, Radha. "Settling Partition Hostilities: Lessons Learned, Options Ahead." The Fate of the Nation-state (2004): 247.
O'Leary, Brendan. "Debating partition: justifications and critiques." Revised version of portion of a paper presented at final conference of the Mapping frontiers, plotting pathways: routes to north–south cooperation in a divided island programme, City Hotel, Armagh, 19–20 January 2006. University College Dublin. Institute for British-Irish Studies, 2006.
Horowitz, Michael C., Alex Weisiger, and Carter Johnson. "The limits to partition." International Security 33.4 (2009): 203–210.
Kumar, Radha. "The Partition Debate: Colonialism Revisited or New Policies?." The Brown Journal of World Affairs 7.1 (2000): 3–11.

 
Borders